Boston City Council elections were held on November 8, 2005. Ten seats (six district representatives and four at-large members) were contested in the general election, as the incumbents in districts 5, 7, and 8 were unopposed. Five seats (the four at-large members, and district 9) had also been contested in the preliminary election held on September 27, 2005.

At-large
Councillors Michael F. Flaherty, Felix D. Arroyo, and Stephen J. Murphy were re-elected, while the seat formerly held by Maura Hennigan was won by Sam Yoon. Hennigan did not seek re-election, as she ran for Mayor of Boston; she was defeated by incumbent Thomas Menino in the general election. Yoon became the first Asian American to hold elected office in Boston.

 write-in votes

District 1

General election
Councillor Paul Scapicchio was re-elected.

Special election
Scapicchio resigned his seat effective April 30, 2006, in order to join a private lobbying firm. This created a vacancy that needed to be filled by a special election, which took place on June 13, 2006, with the preliminary election on May 16, 2006. Salvatore LaMattina was elected to serve the remainder of Scapicchio's term.

District 2

General election
Councillor James M. Kelly was re-elected.

Special election
Kelly died in January 2007, creating a vacancy that needed to be filled by a special election, which took place on May 15, 2007, with the preliminary election on April 17, 2007. Bill Linehan was elected to serve the remainder of Kelly's term.

 write-in votes

District 3
Councillor Maureen Feeney was re-elected.

District 4
Councillor Charles Yancey was re-elected.

 write-in votes

District 5
Councillor Robert Consalvo ran unopposed and was re-elected.

District 6
Councillor John M. Tobin Jr. was re-elected.

District 7
Councillor Chuck Turner ran unopposed and was re-elected.

District 8
Councillor Michael P. Ross ran unopposed and was re-elected.

District 9
Councillor Jerry P. McDermott was re-elected.

See also
 List of members of Boston City Council
 Boston mayoral election, 2005

References

Further reading

External links
 2005 Election Results at boston.gov

City Council election
Boston City Council elections
Boston City Council election
Boston City Council